DeWayne Barrett (born December 27, 1981) is a Jamaican sprinter who specializes in the 400 meters. He won a silver medal in the 4x400 m relay at the 2008 World Indoor Championships in Valencia, along with Michael Blackwood, Edino Steele, and Adrian Findlay. He also won a silver medal in the 2005 Summer Universiade in the 400 m.

He attended St. John's University in New York City, and graduated in 2005.

References 

1981 births
Living people
Jamaican male sprinters
World Athletics Indoor Championships medalists
Universiade silver medalists for Jamaica
Universiade medalists in athletics (track and field)
Medalists at the 2005 Summer Universiade